The Mods is a 2014 Italian short 3D CG animated children's film created by Antonio Padovan and Alessandro Portincasa, about a snake and a dinosaur trying to build a model of a T-Rex. The film's characters are nonverbal and were intended to star in a series of stories. The Mods won an award at the Giffoni Film Festival in 2015.

Plot
Soya the snake is building a "3D puzzle" or model of a T-Rex. The ground shakes as his clumsy friend Michelino, an actual miniature T-Rex, lumbers along and, seeing the blueprints, becomes interested in what Soya is doing and wants to help, to Soya's annoyance. Soya has already had to start over due to the ground shaking from Michelino's heavy steps but then Michelino accidentally knocks the model down a second time.

Frustrated, Soya gives up and swallows the model's pieces rather than rebuild them. Lights similar to X-rays seem to flash as Michelino jumps up and down, such that the jumbled pieces becomes visible inside Soya, changing their configuration with each bound by Michelino. Eventually, they are reassembled as they are supposed to be in Soya's body, which now looks like a T-Rex.

Production and related works

Background
Raised in Bologna, Alessandro Portincasa obtained a master's degree in computer graphics and moved to Scotland, where he worked in the production of feature films and shorts as a rigger. In 2011 he returned to Italy and became a technical director and partner at the AliMik animation studio. Italian-born writer and director Antonio Padovan moved to New York City, where he eventually received a scholarship to the New York Film Academy and initially made films about common people and their problems. The Mods was his first animated film project and his first film made in Italy.

Music
The Mods is nonverbal, the characters' utterances amounting to exclamations or grunts, but there is an original score produced by 93 Steps, an audio production company based in Northern Italy near Venice, and Los Angeles, founded by its executive team Francesco Libralon and Lorenzo Scagnolari.

Series
The Mods was conceived as the first episode of a series of "short stories inspired by the world of toys and fantasy."  The Mods page on the AliMik website features a brief animated POV shot of Soya and Michelino setting up a camera to film themselves. As of 2019, a full series has not been realised, but a few other short sequences were made both before and after The Mods.

Introducing Michelino
A 35-second animation titled Introducing Michelino was uploaded to Behancé in October 2013, in which Michelino's steps shake the 3D logo of AliMik. As Michelino stands up the letter k, the dot on the letter i falls off.

Merry Christmas from AliMik and Happy Holidays
A six-second Christmas video featuring both characters was uploaded in December 2014. A sixteen-second video of Michelino standing in snow, dressed in winter holiday attire but with exposed, shivering legs, was also uploaded.

Release and reception
The Mods played primarily at Italian film festivals in 2014 and 2015, including Giffoni, the largest children's film festival in the world, where it was part of the "Elements +3" section. and won the Giotto special prize.

The short's first screening outside of Italy but within Europe was at the Annecy Animation Festival. Other festivals where it played in Europe in 2016 included Zlín in May–June and Berwick in September. 
The short was shown outside of Europe for the first time at the Seattle Children's Film Festival in early 2016. Other American festivals followed, including the BAM Kids Festival on 27 and 28 February, and the REDCAT International Children's Film Festival in April–May 2016.

Critical response
Official reasons given for the short's award cited its "original" storyboard and animation, "supported by a strong sound design which amazed the audience"; the world of Soya and Michelino is "off-beat" and the characters are "funny and creative".

Accolade
Giffoni Film Festival, 2015 • Giotto Super Be-Bè Special Prize

Notes

References

External links
Trailer on YouTube
Trailer on DailyMotion
Online release on AliMik website

Italian animated short films
2014 animated films